African Australians refers to Australians who were born on the African continent and migrated to Australia, or who have or had an immediate ancestor who made such a migration. Large-scale immigration from Africa to Australia is only a recent phenomenon, with Europe and Asia traditionally being the largest sources of migration to Australia. Data from the 2016 Australian census shows that the predominant country of birth by far for residents of Australia from Africa was South Africa; however African Australians come from diverse ethnic, cultural, linguistic, religious, educational and employment backgrounds.

History

Large-scale immigration from Africa to Australia is only a recent phenomenon, with Europe and Asia traditionally being the largest sources of migration to Australia. 

Coins minted by the Tanzanian medieval kingdom of Kilwa Sultanate have been found on the Wessel Islands. This indicates trade with Africa as early as the 12th century. They are the oldest foreign artefacts ever discovered in Australia. Other people descended from African emigrants later arrived indirectly via the First Fleet and 19th century multicultural maritime industry. Notable examples are Billy Blue, John Caesar, and Black Jack Anderson.

Migrants from Mauritius have also been arriving in Australia since before federation in 1901. They came as convicts, prospectors who sought Victoria's goldfields, or skilled sugar workers who significantly helped to develop Queensland's sugar industry.

The Special Commonwealth African Assistance Plan enabled students from British Commonwealth African countries, including from Ghana, to travel to Australia during the mid-1960s. More than 70 percent of those from West African countries remained in Australia following military coup d'états in their countries of birth.

However, immigration from Africa to Australia generally remained limited until the 1990s, thus compared to other established European and American countries, African Australian community remains new in the country itself.

In 2005–06, permanent settler arrivals to Australia included 4,000 South Africans and 3,800 Sudanese, constituting the sixth and seventh largest sources of migrants, respectively.

Demographics

African Australians are Australians of direct African ancestry. They are from diverse racial, cultural, linguistic, religious, educational and employment backgrounds. The majority (72.6%) of African emigrants to Australia are from southern and eastern Africa. The Australian Bureau of Statistics classifies all residents into cultural and ethnic groups according to geographical origin.

Migration streams

Some of the most significant migration streams as of 2011-2012 were as follows:

The largest number of African immigrants in Australia come from South Africa and are largely of Afrikaner and British (White South African) descent. Many migrants born in Zimbabwe left the country after major land reforms were begun in the 1980s by the Robert Mugabe government. Two-thirds arrived after 2001, following economic uncertainty in their country of birth. In the 2011 Census, of the Zimbabwe-born migrants who moved to Australia, the largest proportion were of English (30.6%) ancestry, with some individuals of Scottish (7.3%) background present as well. More recent migration from Zimbabwe has included increasing numbers of people of Shona and Ndebele ethnicities.

Other immigrants from Africa arrived via humanitarian programs, mostly from East Africa. In the 2011–2012 fiscal year, these individuals were mainly from Burundi (44/79), Congo (143/158), the Democratic Republic of the Congo (370/454), Eritrea (244/294), Malawi (57/71), Rwanda (44/62), and Tanzania (40/67).

Additionally, other immigrants from Africa arrived through a family reunion migration stream. In the 2011–2012 fiscal year, these individuals were primarily from Ethiopia (412/802), Ghana (152/202), Guinea (33/62), Liberia (82/129), Sierra Leone (106/140), Somalia (164/420), Sudan (313/513), and Uganda (37/67).

A significant number of African migrants have come to Australia through a skilled migration stream. In the 2011–2012 fiscal year, these individuals were chiefly from Egypt (417/773), Kenya (188/415), Mauritius (228/303), Nigeria (126/250), South Africa (4,239/6,307), Zambia (35/115), and Zimbabwe (467/848).

Some African immigrants have also arrived via a secondary migration from New Zealand, where they are citizens. In the 2011–2012 fiscal year, these New Zealand nationals were mainly originally from Libya (31/76).

Broadcasting services for African migrants
Multicultural broadcaster Special Broadcasting Service (SBS) broadcasts in five African languages on radio, including Dinka of South Sudan, Swahili of Tanzania and the African Great Lakes region, Tigrinya of Eritrea and Amharic of Ethiopia. Arabic broadcasting began with a 6am service by SBS in 1975, and from 2016, SBS began a year-long trial of SBS Arabic 24, a 24/7 digital radio station and website. It continues today and includes an Arabic24 podcast. An English language program, simply called SBS African (nicknamed the African Hour) was broadcast until 2017, when it was cut from schedule. 2ME Radio Arabic also broadcasts in Arabic throughout Australia.

Social status
As Africans only began to migrate to Australia in larger numbers much later than Africans were brought to the United States as slaves, and those who settled in parts of Europe, African Australian status is largely a new challenge for Australian authorities, and it is acknowledged that widespread racism against Africans is not uncommon in Australia. Research on the experience of African Australians began in the 2000s and more has been conducted since the 2010s as more and more Africans, mostly from East Africa, have arrived in the country.

Relationship to Indigenous Australians

The concept of how the American notion of "blackness" was adopted and adapted by Aboriginal civil rights activists has been little known or understood in the US. In 2011, the Museum of Contemporary African Diasporan Arts in New York mounted an exhibition of Indigenous Australian art, concerned with making connections between the current civil rights and spiritual movements of Indigenous Australians and that of black people in America and elsewhere.

A 2012 study looked at attitudes towards African immigrants in Western Australia, based on a survey of 184 Australians, examining the quantitative data for use in developing strategies to combat prejudice, and the media's role in the development of negative attitudes. It compared the results of the study with those previously found in looking at attitudes towards Indigenous and Muslim Australians.

Natasha Guantai, in response to Roxane Gay's initial implication that the only "Black people" in Australia would be of African descent, wrote "In the dominant Australian narrative, Blacks are regarded as Aboriginal. This is a narrative with little space for non-Indigenous Black Australians". Guantai goes on to highlight some differences in the experience of the various groups - Indigenous Australians, immigrants from Africa, the Black descendants of settlers, and Black people who arrive from other white-majority countries such as the UK or the US.

In 2018 Kaiya Aboagye, a PhD student of Ghanaian, Aboriginal, South Sea and Torres Strait Islander heritage, underlined the African connection to Aboriginal Australians, citing "long histories of African/Indigenous relationships both inside and outside Australia", despite the many and varied origins and experiences of blackness among peoples in the Global South.

Relationship with the criminal justice system
In 2021, it was reported that African Australians, predominantly of South Sudanese descent, comprised 19 percent of young people in custody in Victoria, despite making up less than 0.5 percent of the overall population. Previously, in 2013 Victoria Police settled a racial profiling complaint lodged by members of the African community by agreeing to review its procedures. A 2020 study in the Australian and New Zealand Journal of Criminology found that South Sudanese-born individuals were significantly overrepresented in as perpetrators of "crimes against the person", such as robbery and assault, but that "rates for less serious crimes, such as public order and drug offences, have remained stable and relatively low for South Sudanese-born youth".

African Australian identity

African Australian identity is the objective or subjective state of perceiving oneself as an African Australian and as relating to being African Australian. As a group identity, "African Australian" can denote pan-African ethnic identity, as well as a diasporic identity in relation to the perception of Africa as a homeland.

Notable African Australians
This list includes only individuals who immigrated directly from Africa to Australia, plus those who had an immediate ancestor who made such a migration. Individuals of African origin who migrated from non-African countries, or those whose entire African ancestry stems from such migration, are not included.

In recent years, African Australian soccer players have been prominent in men's soccer in Australia, with 34 players making an appearance in the 2020-2021 A-League season, up on 26 the previous year. These include Kusini Yengi and his brother, Tete Yengi, from South Sudan, and their friends, brothers Mohamed and Al Hassan Toure. 

 Yassmin Abdel-Magied
 Deng Adel
 Faustina Agolley
 Berhan Ahmed
 Adut Akech
 Aliir Aliir
 Waleed Aly
 Kwabena Appiah
 Francis Awaritefe
 Albert Bensimon
 Emelia Burns
 Isaka Cernak
 Kofi Danning
 Majak Daw
 Thomas Deng
 Diafrix
 Bruce Djite 
 DyspOra 
 Anton Enus
 Abebe Fekadu
 Jason Geria
 David Gonski
 George Gregan
 Dorinda Hafner
 Nuala Hafner
 Bernie Ibini-Isei
 Jamal Idris
 Nestory Irankunda
 Changkuoth Jiath
 Citizen Kay
 Patrick Kisnorbo
 Alou Kuol
 Garang Kuol
 Marnus Labuschagne
 Daine Laurie
 Keiynan Lonsdale
 Heritier Lumumba
 Awer Mabil
 Tkay Maidza
 Ater Majok
 Majok Majok
 Thon Maker
 Mangok Mathiang
 Golgol Mebrahtu
 Sisonke Msimang
 Audius Mtawarira
 Mathiang Muo
 Tendai Mzungu
 Henry Ninio
 Nyadol Nyuon
 Akmal Saleh
 Timomatic
 Al Hassan Toure
 Mohamed Toure
 Musa Toure
 Tando Velaphi
 Kusini Yengi
 Tete Yengi

See also

 African immigration to Europe
 American Australians, a category that includes Australians of African-American descent
 Arab Australians
 Black Australians (disambiguation)
 Congolese Australians
 Egyptian Australians
 Ethiopian Australians
 Ghanaian Australians
 Kenyan Australians
 Mauritian Australians
 Nigerian Australians
Somali Australians
 South African Australians
 South Sudanese Australians
 Sudanese Australians
 Zimbabwean Australians

References

Further reading
 AfricanOz – Africa Australia online resource (archived)

External links
 TV programs online, on Foxtel, C31 Melbourne & Geelong, Channel 44 (Adelaide)

 
+
People of African descent